Bowman House, and variations, may refer to:

(by state, then city/town)

 W. G. Bowman House, Nogales, Arizona, listed on the NRHP in Arizona
 William Norman Bowman House-Yamecila, Denver, Colorado, listed on the NRHP in Colorado
 Bowman-Pirkle House, Buford, Georgia, listed on the NRHP in Georgia
 McCormack-Bowman House, Clayton, Indiana, listed on the NRHP in Indiana
 Joseph Bowman Farmhouse, Garrett, Indiana, listed on the NRHP in Indiana
 James W. and Ida G. Bowman House, Marion, Iowa, listed on the NRHP in Iowa
 Col. John Bowman House, Harrodsburg, Kentucky, listed on the NRHP in Kentucky
Bowman Houses, Lexington, Kentucky, listed on the NRHP in Kentucky
 Bowman House (Dresden, Maine), NRHP-listed
 Bowman House (Boonsboro, Maryland), NRHP-listed
 Jones-Bowman House, Columbiana, Ohio, NRHP-listed
 John and Ellen Bowman House, Portland, Oregon, NRHP-listed
 Bowman's Castle, Brownsville, Pennsylvania, NRHP-listed
 Bowman Homestead, McKeesport, Pennsylvania, NRHP-listed
 Bowman House (Loudon, Tennessee), listed on the NRHP in Tennessee
 Bowman-Chamberlain House, Kanab, Utah, NRHP-listed
 Bowman House (Wisconsin Dells, Wisconsin), NRHP-listed